The Donetsk Gubernatorial Committee of the Communist Party of Ukraine, commonly referred to as the Donetsk CPU gubkom, was a regional branch of the Communist Party of (Bolsheviks) Ukraine in Donetsk Governorate.

The Donetsk Governorate was established on 5 February 1920 out of parts of Yekaterinoslav Governorate, Kharkov Governorate, and Don Host Oblast. Due to difficult situation in the region, the governorate was governed by a local revolutionary committee (revkom). The gubernatorial committee was finally established in September 1920.

Chairmen

Donets Gubernatorial Revolutionary Committee (1920)

Kiev Gubernatorial Committee (1920-1925)

Chairpersons

Ispolkom of Soviet (1920-1925)

Districts

In 1923 the Ukrainian SSR was split into okruhas (not to be confused with okrugs).

The Donetsk Governorate was initially split into 7 okruhas centered in following cities: Bakhmut, Luhansk, Mariupol, Yuzovka, Starobilsk, Taganrog, and Shakhty.

Yuzivka-Stalino Okruha Committee (1925-1930)

See also
Administrative divisions of Ukraine (1918–1925)
Governor of Donetsk Oblast
Governor of Luhansk Oblast
Donetsk Regional Committee of the Communist Party of Ukraine
Luhansk Regional Committee of the Communist Party of Ukraine

External links
Donetsk Governorate at the Handbook on history of the Communist Party and the Soviet Union 1898–1991

Organization of the Communist Party of Ukraine (Soviet Union)
Ukrainian Soviet Socialist Republic
History of Donetsk Oblast
History of Luhansk Oblast
Communist Party of Ukraine (Soviet Union)
Branches of the Communist Party of the Soviet Union
Organization of the Communist Party of the Soviet Union
1920 establishments in Russia
1930 disestablishments in the Soviet Union